Mickey's Touchdown is a 1933 short film in Larry Darmour's Mickey McGuire series starring a young Mickey Rooney. Directed by Jesse Duffy, the two-reel short was released to theaters on October 14, 1933 by Post Pictures Corp.

Plot
Mickey and the Gang are gearing up for a football game against Stinkey Davis and his pals. Because Mickey's team apparently have no chance of winning, they enlist the aid of college football coach Howard Jones for advice. Jealous, Stinkey decides to steal Mickey's clothes, dress up as him, and cause havoc in town. His plan manages to get Mickey stuck in a courtroom for the day and out of the game. It's up to Howard Jones and Mickey's pals to save the day.

Notes
First appearances of Douglas Scott and Shirley Jean Rickert who (respectively) took over for the roles of 'Stinkey Davis' and 'Tomboy Taylor'.

Cast
In Order by Credits:
Mickey Rooney - Mickey McGuire
Douglas Scott - "Stinkey" Davis
Marvin Stephens - Katrink'
Jimmie Robinson - "Hambone" Johnson
Billy Barty - Billy McGuire ("Mickey's Little Brother")
Shirley Jeane Rickert - "Tomboy" Taylor
Kit Guard - "Stinkey" Davis Coach
Howard Jones - Himself
Spec O'Donnell - Referee (uncredited)
Robert McKenzie - Judge (uncredited)

References

External links
 

1933 films
1933 comedy films
American black-and-white films
Mickey McGuire short film series
1933 short films
American comedy short films
1940s English-language films
1930s English-language films